Jason Gavin is a television writer. He has worked on the NBC drama series Friday Night Lights as a writer. He was nominated for a Writers Guild of America (WGA) Award for Best Dramatic Series at the February 2009 ceremony for his work on the third season of Friday Night Lights. He was nominated for the WGA Award for Best Drama Series for a second consecutive year at the February 2010 ceremony for his work on the fourth season.

References

Year of birth missing (living people)
Living people
American male screenwriters
American male television writers
American television writers